Dalibor Pleva (born 2 April 1984) is a Slovak footballer who plays as a midfielder for ŠK LR Crystal Lednické Rovne.

Dalibor Pleva 
 
 Profile at official club website 

1984 births
Living people
Slovak footballers
FK Dubnica players
Bruk-Bet Termalica Nieciecza players
FK Dukla Banská Bystrica players
GKS Katowice players
FC ViOn Zlaté Moravce players
Association football midfielders
Slovak Super Liga players
Ekstraklasa players
Slovak expatriate footballers
Slovak expatriate sportspeople in Poland
Expatriate footballers in Poland
Sportspeople from Trenčín